Summer of Love is a Big Finish Productions audio drama featuring Lisa Bowerman as Bernice Summerfield, a character from the spin-off media based on the long-running British science fiction television series Doctor Who.

Plot 
It's the hottest summer the Braxiatel Collection has ever seen, and as neighbouring aliens try to take advantage of the weakened state of affairs, the inhabitants find themselves with only one thing on their mind - sex.

Cast
Bernice Summerfield - Lisa Bowerman
Bev Tarrant - Louise Faulkner
Jason Kane - Stephen Fewell
Minko - Joseph Lidster
Adrian Wall - Harry Myers
Doggles - Sam Stevens
Joseph - Steven Wickham
Hass - Paul Wolfe

Trivia
 This audio play marks the first appearance of characters Hass and Doggles outside the novel series. They are credited under the names Sam Stevens and Paul Wolfe; in fact pseudonyms for actors Steven Wickham and Harry Myers respectively.

External links
Big Finish Productions - Professor Bernice Summerfield: Summer of Love

Summer of Love
Fiction set in the 27th century